Alexander Willis Edgar (September 17, 1898 - December 18, 1970) was a professional American football player for the Buffalo All-Americans and the Akron Pros. He attended high school in Wilkinsburg, Pennsylvania and The Kiski School.  He attended college Bucknell University, University of Pittsburgh and  Washington & Jefferson College.

See also
 1923 Buffalo All-Americans season
 1923 Akron Pros season

References

Players of American football from Iowa
Players of American football from Pennsylvania
1898 births
1970 deaths
Buffalo All-Americans players
Akron Pros players
Washington & Jefferson Presidents football players
Washington & Jefferson College alumni
Bucknell University alumni
University of Pittsburgh alumni
People from Louisa County, Iowa